Brulino-Koski  is a village in the administrative district of Gmina Czyżew-Osada, within Wysokie Mazowieckie County, Podlaskie Voivodeship, in north-eastern Poland.

The village has an approximate population of 90.

References

Brulino-Koski